Olutosin Araromi (born 8 January 1993) is a Nigerian-American model and beauty pageant titleholder, she was crowned Most Beautiful Girl in Nigeria Universe 2019. She represented Nigeria at the Miss Universe 2019.

Personal life
She was born and raised in New Jersey, United States, she holds a bachelor's degree in Health and Human Services from Montclair State University.

Pageantry
Olutosin started her career in 2015 when she won the Miss Nigeria USA pageantry.

Most Beautiful Girl In Nigeria
She won the Most Beautiful Girl In Nigeria Universe 2019, the event was held in 11 October at the Gabriel Okara Cultural Centre Yenegoa, Bayelsa.  she represented Taraba state.

Miss Universe
Olutosin represented Nigeria at the 68th Miss Universe pageant, which was held on December 8, 2019, at Tyler Perry Studios in Atlanta, Georgia where she placed in the top 20.

References

1993 births
Living people
Miss Universe 2019 contestants
Most Beautiful Girl in Nigeria contestants
Most Beautiful Girl in Nigeria winners
Yoruba beauty pageant contestants
People from New Jersey
Nigerian female models
Nigerian beauty pageant winners
American people of Yoruba descent
American people of Nigerian descent
Beauty pageant contestants from New Jersey
Yoruba people